Easby is a village and civil parish in Hambleton District of North Yorkshire, England. The larger village of Low Easby lies  down the road, but neither have any amenities, only a postbox.

The name Easby comes from Old Norse and means farmstead or village of a man called Esa.

References

External links

Villages in North Yorkshire
Civil parishes in North Yorkshire